Nassarius johni is a species of sea snail, a marine gastropod mollusk in the family Nassariidae, the Nassa mud snails or dog whelks.

Description

The length of the shell varies between 4 mm and 8 mm.

Distribution
This species occurs in the Alboran Sea, off Morocco.

References

 Cernohorsky W. O. (1984). Systematics of the family Nassariidae (Mollusca: Gastropoda). Bulletin of the Auckland Institute and Museum 14: 1–356.
 Gofas, S.; Le Renard, J.; Bouchet, P. (2001). Mollusca, in: Costello, M.J. et al. (Ed.) (2001). European register of marine species: a check-list of the marine species in Europe and a bibliography of guides to their identification. Collection Patrimoines Naturels, 50: pp. 180–213

External links
 Monterosato, T. A. di. (1889). Coquilles marines Marocaines. Journal de Conchyliologie. 37(1): 20-40 [May 2nd, 1889; 37(2): 112-121]
 Galindo, L. A.; Puillandre, N.; Utge, J.; Lozouet, P.; Bouchet, P. (2016). The phylogeny and systematics of the Nassariidae revisited (Gastropoda, Buccinoidea). Molecular Phylogenetics and Evolution. 99: 337-353.
 

Nassariidae
Gastropods described in 1889